Darin Richard Pastor (born February 19, 1971) is an American businessman and entrepreneur. He is the Chairman and Chief Executive Officer of Capstone Financial Group, Inc. Pastor has worked at the financial firm JPMorgan Chase. 

On August 18, 2022, a federal grand jury issued an indictment charging Pastor and a collaborator with conspiracy to commit wire fraud and securities fraud. It was alleged by authorities that Pastor maintained a fraudulent Wikipedia page to back up claims that he was wealthy, which allowed potential investors in his business Capstone Group to find his information online.

Education
Pastor majored in psychology and sociology at Drexel University in Philadelphia, Pennsylvania. He enrolled in the Wharton School of the University of Pennsylvania.

Career
Pastor worked at JPMorgan Chase & Co. for four years, where he was senior vice president and senior investment manager. In 2010, Pastor became the territory sales manager for the Colonial Life & Accident Insurance Company.

In October 2012, Pastor and five financial advisors founded Capstone Affluent Strategies.

In 2013, Pastor submitted a bid to acquire the NHL’s Phoenix Coyotes franchise. The NHL rejected Pastor's bid on May 13, 2013, citing the bid was "inconsistent with what we had previously indicated were the minimum prerequisites" of a bid.

Criminal charges 
In August 2018 he inappropriately touched a woman on a flight. He was sentenced to probation.

In August 18, 2022, a federal grand jury issued an indictment charging Pastor and a collaborator with conspiracy to commit wire fraud and securities fraud. Authorities said that Pastor maintained a fraudulent Wikipedia page to back up claims that he was wealthy, which allowed potential investors in his business Capstone Group to find his information online. The fraud allegedly began in 2013 when Pastor and Halford W. Johnson acquired Creative App Solutions, a publicly traded company, whose name was then changed to Capstone Financial Group. From 2013 to 2017, 95 investors bought 19 million dollars of Capstone stock. Presentations made to investors regarding the company's assets were false.

Family 
The Pastor family owned the Pepsi-Cola Buffalo Bottling Corp., a former regional Pepsi distribution business sold in 2002.

References

American business executives
Businesspeople from Buffalo, New York
Drexel University alumni
Wharton School of the University of Pennsylvania alumni
1971 births
Living people